Coleophora agilis is a moth of the family Coleophoridae. It is found on the Iberian Peninsula.

References

agilis
Moths described in 1998
Moths of Europe